Henry Sharpe may refer to:

 Henry Granville Sharpe (1858–1947), US Army officer
 Henry Sharpe (priest) (fl. 1620s), Anglican priest in Ireland
 Henry A. Sharpe (1848–1919), Justice of the Alabama Supreme Court